Kate Young (born 1955) is a former Canadian politician and journalist who served as the Member of Parliament (MP) for the riding of London West from 2015 to 2021.

Background

Before entering politics, Young worked as a news anchor of London's CFPL-TV. She is also the former manager of public affairs and community relations for the Thames Valley District School Board.

Federal politics

Young was first elected in the 2015 federal election, defeating Conservative incumbent Ed Holder. She was re-elected in the 2019 federal election.

After her election in 2015, Young was appointed the Parliamentary Secretary to the Minister of Transport, Marc Garneau. In a 2017 cabinet reshuffle, Young was moved to the position of Parliamentary Secretary to the Minister of Science and Sport as well as the Parliamentary Secretary to the Minister of Public Services and Procurement and Accessibility in 2018. Following the 2019 federal election, Young was appointed Parliamentary Secretary to the Minister of Economic Development and Official Languages.

In March 2021, Young announced that she would not be running in the 2021 federal election. She was succeeded by Arielle Kayabaga.

Electoral record

References

Living people
Members of the House of Commons of Canada from Ontario
Liberal Party of Canada MPs
Politicians from London, Ontario
Women members of the House of Commons of Canada
Canadian television news anchors
Canadian women television journalists
Canadian public relations people
Fanshawe College alumni
Women in Ontario politics
21st-century Canadian politicians
21st-century Canadian women politicians
1955 births